The Chapel of Antiguo Seminario Santa María de Jesús (Spanish: Capilla del Antiguo Seminario Santa María de Jesús) is a chapel located in Sevilla, Spain. It was declared Bien de Interés Cultural in 1901.

References

See also 

 List of Bien de Interés Cultural in the Province of Seville

Bien de Interés Cultural landmarks in the Province of Seville
Roman Catholic chapels in Spain